Sphingolipidoses are a class of lipid storage disorders or degenerative storage disorders caused by deficiency of an enzyme that is required for the catabolism of lipids that contain ceramide, also relating to sphingolipid metabolism. The main members of this group are Niemann–Pick disease, Fabry disease, Krabbe disease, Gaucher disease, Tay–Sachs disease and metachromatic leukodystrophy. They are generally inherited in an autosomal recessive fashion, but notably Fabry disease is X-linked recessive. Taken together, sphingolipidoses have an incidence of approximately 1 in 10,000, but substantially more in certain populations such as Ashkenazi Jews. Enzyme replacement therapy is available to treat mainly Fabry disease and Gaucher disease, and people with these types of sphingolipidoses may live well into adulthood. The other types are generally fatal by age 1 to 5 years for infantile forms, but progression may be mild for juvenile- or adult-onset forms.

Accumulated products
 Gangliosides: Gangliosidosis
 GM1 gangliosidoses
 GM2 gangliosidoses
 Tay–Sachs disease
 Sandhoff disease
 GM2-gangliosidosis, AB variant
 Glycolipids
 Fabry's disease
 Krabbe disease
 Metachromatic leukodystrophy
Glucocerebrosides
Gaucher's disease

Comparison

Metabolic pathways

See also
 Lipid storage disorder

References

External links 

 

Lipid storage disorders